The 2021 U.S. Senior Women's Open was the third U.S. Senior Women's Open. It was a professional golf tournament organized by the United States Golf Association, open to women over 50 years of age. The championship was played at the Brooklawn Country Club, Fairfield, Connecticut, United States, from July 29 to August 1 and won by Annika Sörenstam.

The 2020 championship was canceled due to health concerns stemming from the COVID-19 pandemic.

Venue 

The hosting club was founded in 1895. It had previously hosted four USGA Championships, including the 1979 U.S. Women's Open.

Course layout
The final length came to differ between each round. Fourth round length is shown.

Format
The walking-only tournament was played over 72 holes of stroke play, with the top 50 and ties making the 36-hole cut.

Field
The championship was open to any professional or amateur golfer who was 50 years of age or over as of July 29, however restricted by a certain handicap level.

390 players entered the competition, either exempt through some of several exemption categories or entering sectional qualifying at sites nationwide in the summer of 2021.

The final field of 120 players, consisting of 87 professionals and 33 amateurs, included 60 exempt players, while 60 players earned their spots in the field via qualifying.

Exempt from qualifying
Many players were exempt in multiple categories. Players are listed only once, in the first category in which they became exempt.

1. Former winners of the U.S. Senior Women's Open Championship

Laura Davies (2018)
Helen Alfredsson (2019)

2. From the 2019 U.S. Senior Women's Open Championship, the 20 lowest scorers and anyone tying for 20th place

Danielle Ammaccapane
Nanci Bowen
Lisa DePaulo
Cheryl Fox
Jackie Gallagher-Smith
Tammie Green
Suzy Green-Roebuck
Juli Inkster
Becky Iverson
Trish Johnson
Barbara Moxness
Michele Redman
Yuko Saito
Laura Shanahan-Rowe
Maggie Will

Donna Andrews, Jane Crafter, and Wendy Doolan did not play.

3. From the 2019 U.S. Senior Women's Open Championship, the amateur(s) returning the lowest 72-hole score

Sally Krueger (a)
Judith Kyrinis (a)

4. Winners of the U.S. Women's Open Championship who reached their 50th birthday on or before July 29, 2021 (ten year exemption)

Amy Alcott
Jerilyn Britz
JoAnne Carner
Jane Geddes
Liselotte Neumann
Alison Nicholas
Annika Sörenstam
Hollis Stacy
Jan Stephenson

 Janet Alex Anderson, Kathy Baker Guadagnino, Susie Berning, Pat Bradley, Donna Caponi, Kathy Cornelius, Sandra Haynie, Betsy King, Catherine Lacoste, Murle Lindstrom, Meg Mallon, Lauri Merten, Mary Mills, Sandra Palmer, Betsy Rawls and Patty Sheehan did not play

5. From the 2019, 2020 & 2021 U.S. Women's Open Championship, any player returning a 72-hole score who is age eligible.

6. Any professional or applicant for reinstatement who has won the U.S. Women's Amateur Championship, and who has reached their 50th birthday on or before July 29, 2021 (three-year exemption)

Laura Baugh
Carolyn Hill
Pat Hurst
Joanne Pacillo Foreman

 Kay Cockerill, Jean Ashley Crawford, Beth Daniel, Mary Lou Dill, Amy Fruhwirth, Michiko Hattori, Cindy Hill, Donna Horton, Deb Richard, Cathy Sherk and Pearl Sinn did not play.

7. Winners of the U.S. Women's Amateur Championship who reached their 50th birthday on or before July 29, 2021 (must be an amateur; five-year exemption)

Carol Semple Thompson

  Mary Budke, Martha Kirouac, Patricia Lesser Harbottle, Barbara McIntire, Anne Quast Sander, Marlene Stewart Streit did not play.

8. Winners of the 2018 and 2019 U.S. Senior Women's Amateur Championship, and the 2019 runner-up (must be an amateur)

Lara Tennant (2018 and 2019 champion)
Sue Wooster (2019 runner-up)

9. Winners of the 2018 and 2019 U.S. Women's Mid-Amateur Championship (must be an amateur)

10. Playing members of the two most recent United States and Great Britain & Ireland Curtis Cup Teams, and the two most current United States Women's World Amateur Teams (must be an amateur)

11. Winners of the 2017-2019 Senior LPGA Championship, and the 2018 and 2019 runners-up

12. From the 2019 Senior LPGA Championship, the 10 lowest scorers and anyone tying for 10th place

Jean Bartholomew
Lisa Grimes
Rosie Jones

13. From the final 2018 and 2019 official Legends Tour Performance Points list, the top 30 point leaders and ties

Alica Dibos
Cindy Figg-Currier
Christa Johnson
Cathy Johnston-Forbes
Marilyn Lovander
Susie Redman

  Barb Mucha did not play

14. Winners of the Legends Tour co-sponsored events, excluding team events, whose victories are considere official, in 2018 and 2019 and during the current calendar year to the initiation of the current year's U.S. Senior Women's Open Championship (events minimum of 36 holes)

15. Winners of the LPGA Teaching & Club Professional Championship (Championship Division) from 2015 to 2019, and the five lowest scores and ties from the most recent Championship (2019)

Laurie Rinker (2015)

16. From the 2019 LPGA Teaching & Club Professional Championship (Senior Division), the three lowest scores and ties

Jamie Fischer

17. Winners of the 2019 R&A Women's Senior Amateur and Canadian Women's Senior Amateur Championships (must be an amateur)

18. Winners of the following events when deemed a major by the LPGA Tour and who reached their 50th birthday on or before July 29, 2021. ANA Inspiration (1983-present); Evian Championship (2013-present); AIG Women's British Open (2019-present); Ricoh Women's British Open (2001-18); du Maurier Classic (1979-2000); KPMG Wome's PGA Championship (1955-present); Titleholders Championship (1946-66 & 1972) or Western Open (1930-1967). (This is a ten year exemption)

Catriona Matthew
Nancy Scranton

 Jody Anschutz, Gloria Ehret, Shirley Englehorn, Marlene Hagge, Chako Higuchi, Judy Kimball, Jenny Lidback, Sally Little, Nancy Lopez, Alice Miller, Martha Nause, Dottie Pepper, Sandra Post, Kelly Robbins, Sherry Steinhauer, Sherri Turner, Kathy Whitworth and Joyce Ziski did not play.

19. From the final 2020 LPGA Tour all-time money list, the top 10 players who are age-eligible and not otherwise exempt as of March 29, 2021

Elaine Crosby
Judy Dickinson
Michelle Estill
Carin Hjalmarsson
Cindy Rarick
Cindy Schreyer

 Vicki Fergon, Kate Golden, Penny Hammel and Alice Ritzman did not play.

20. From the final 2019 LPGA Tour all-time money list, the top 150 money leaders and ties who are age-eligible

Val Skinner
Kristi Albers
Lorie Kane
Kris Tschetter
Michelle McGann

  Dale Eggeling and Kim Saiki-Maloney did not play

21. Winners of the LPGA Tour co-sponsored events, whose victories are considered official, from 2015 to 2020, and during the current calendar year to the initiation of the 2021 U.S. Senior Women's Open Championship

22. Playing members of the five most current United States and European Solheim Cup Teams

23. From the 2019 and 2020 final official Ladies European Tour and Japan LPGA Tour career money lists, the top five money leaders

24. Special exemptions as selected by the USGA

Also exempt:
Catherine Panton-Lewis

Qualifiers
Additional players qualified through sectional qualifying tournaments, which took place from June 15 to July 15, 2021, at 16 different sites across the United States.

Results 
The championship was won by 50-year-old Annika Sörenstam, Sweden, playing in her first U.S. Senior Women's Open, with a score of 276, eight strokes ahead of runner-up and fellow countrywoman Liselotte Neumann. Defending champion Helen Alfredsson, Sweden, finished tied seventh.

Ellen Port and Martha Leach finished low amateurs at tied 20th, each with a score of 6 over par 294.

Final leaderboard
Sunday, August 1, 2021

Sources:

Notes

References

External links 

 

Senior women's major golf championships
Golf in Connecticut
U.S. Senior Women's Open
U.S. Senior Women's Open
U.S. Senior Women's Open
U.S. Senior Women's Open
U.S. Senior Women's Open